Peter Eckersley may refer to:
Peter Eckersley (engineer) (1892–1963), pioneer of British Broadcasting
Peter Eckersley (cricketer) (1904–1940), captain of Lancashire County Cricket Club and MP
Peter Eckersley (TV producer) (1936–1981), British television producer associated with Granada Television
Peter Eckersley (computer scientist) (1979–2022), Australian computer security researcher and activist